The Portage Escarpment is a major landform in the U.S. states of Ohio, Pennsylvania, and New York which marks the boundary between the Till Plains to the north and west and the Appalachian Plateau to the east and south. The escarpment is the defining geological feature of New York's Finger Lakes region. Its proximity to Lake Erie creates a narrow but easily traveled route between upstate New York and the Midwest. Extensive industrial and residential development occurred along this route.

It is also called the Allegheny Escarpment in its southern portion after it diverges from Lake Erie in Ohio.

General description
The Portage Escarpment forms the northern and western boundary between the Appalachian Plateau and the Till Plains of the Central Lowland physiographic section of the United States.

The escarpment begins in eastern New York. Nevin Fenneman placed its starting point between Cayuga Lake and Seneca Lake, where the Onondaga Escarpment transitions to the sandstone of the Portage Escarpment. But New York state officials concluded that it began east of Auburn, New York. As it approaches Buffalo, New York, it turns to the southwest and hugs the shore of Lake Erie. The escarpment moves across northwest Pennsylvania, continuing close to the shoreline.

In Ohio, the escarpment gradually moves further away from shore. At Cleveland, Ohio, it turns sharply southward. It proceeds in an undulating south-southwest direction across Ohio, Kentucky, and Tennessee. In these latter two states it is known as the Highland Rim.

The landform's name is derived from attempts by the French to establish a portage over the escarpment in the 1750s which would link their Great Lakes forts with their fort at Pittsburgh.

New York

In New York state, the Portage Escarpment (also known as the "Finger Lakes sedimentary deposit") consists of sandstone interbedded with shale. The base is almost all black and gray soft shale, while the upper portion is interbedded sandstone and shale. Because the more durable sandstone is not a capstone, the escarpment does not have a sharp, defined cliff or crest. This geologic makeup gives it a slope instead, and it often appears as two or more parallel terraces.

The Portage Escarpment's eastern end is in the Finger Lakes region, where it is the dominant topographic feature. Prior to the Wisconsin glaciation (the last ice age), roughly 24 major rivers flowed north over the escarpment. The Wisconsin glaciation began about 85,000 years ago, and the ice reached its southernmost point approximately 25,000–21,000 years ago during the last glacial maximum. The ice sheet could not overcome the Portage Escarpment. Instead, the ice scoured downward, creating 11 long gouges in the earth. When the ice age ended about 10,000 years ago, these gouges filled with water coming down the escarpment and became the 11 Finger Lakes. The Portage Escarpment essentially runs along the southernmost tips of each finger lake. The glacial gouging and subsequent erosion by rivers and streams has led to the creation of deep valleys which extend southward as far as the southern tip of the Finger Lakes. This makes the escarpment appear to weave north and south in deep loops. The Wisconsin glaciation's scouring of the land in front of the escarpment in the Finger Lakes area has left the escarpment with a steeper slope than elsewhere in New York state. Here, the escarpment can be  in height.

West of the Finger Lakes region, the Portage Escarpment is relatively straight. The interbedded sandstone and shale here has suffered extensive erosion. In Livingston County, New York, this has left it much less well-defined.

The Tonawanda Plain lies along the north side of the escarpment from its eastern terminus to Lake Erie. This lacustrine plain is bounded on the north by the Niagara Escarpment. Although quite wide at the eastern end of Lake Erie, the plain narrows considerably along the lake's southern shore. Here, the plain continues to be bounded by the Portage Escarpment, which turns southwest in a series of indefinite hills at Hamburg, Orchard Park, and East Aurora.

Pennsylvania
The Portage Escarpment continues to hug the southern shoreline of Lake Erie in Pennsylvania.

Ohio

The Portage Escarpment also largely controlled where the Wisconsin glaciation stopped in Ohio. The lacustrine Erie Plain lies beyond it to the northwest and west.

The escarpment continues to hug Lake Erie until it reaches Cleveland. East of Cleveland, much of the lower portions of the escarpment are covered in glacial moraine. Both the upper and lower parts are cut by numerous dry ravines, rivers, and streams. This makes the escarpment somewhat discontinuous. The upper terrace of the escarpment is difficult to distinguish from the Appalachian Plateau beyond, because both are eroded so deeply by water. Where the escarpment meets the Erie Plain, it is much more well-defined.

Where the escarpment meets the valley of the Cuyahoga River, it bends southward and begins moving even further away from the shore. It is  distant from the shore between the Cuyahoga River and the Rocky River, and  distant from the shore west of the Rocky River. The much lower height of the escarpment has allowed glacial till to build up and cover much of the escarpment's topography. This part of the escarpment is extremely discontinuous, as it is broken by the broad river valleys of the Great Miami and Scioto rivers. Southwest of the Scioto River, the escarpment forms the western boundary of the Shawnee–Mississippian Plateau region, the most rugged area in Ohio.

Cultural and historic importance
That portion of the Erie Plain between Lake Erie and the Portage Escarpment connects the Central Lowland of the Midwest with the Mohawk Valley in the east, and provides the only natural, low-lying route north of the Gulf Coast to the North American interior from the Atlantic seaboard. Consequently, this area is heavily populated. Settlement of Ohio largely occurred along the Erie Plain, following the natural route created adjacent to the Portage Escarpment barrier.

References
Notes

References

Bibliography

Escarpments of the United States
Landforms of New York (state)
Landforms of Ohio
Landforms of Pennsylvania